Caio is a genus of moths in the family Saturniidae. The genus was described by Travassos and Noronha in 1968.

Species
Caio championi (Druce, 1886)
Caio chiapasiana Brechlin & Meister, 2010
Caio harrietae (Forbes, 1944)
Caio hidalgensis Brechlin & Meister, 2010
Caio richardsoni (Druce, 1890)
Caio romulus (Maassen, 1869)
Caio undilinea (Schaus, 1921)
Caio witti Brechlin & Meister, 2010

References

Arsenurinae